TeleHit is a Mexican cable/satellite television network. Its main programming is music and music videos. It is a part of Televisa Networks, an affiliate of TelevisaUnivision, and is also available in various countries in Latin America and United States.

Broadcasting since 1993, Telehit became the second Spanish language music video network under MTV. What began as a Spanish music network, now is universal fusion of different musical rhythms, like pop, rock, electronic, hip-hop and reggaeton.

Besides music videos, the channel also broadcasts concerts, TV specials and general-interest content for youth. Telehit has also been a platform for hosts and actors to being into Mexican show business.

Telehit Awards
The Telehit Awards were first presented on November 5, 2008. They emerged in commemoration of its 15 years on Mexican television. These awards recognize the most outstanding artists in music.

Hosts

Current
Adina Burak
Ceci Flores
Barbara Islas
Raul Gemeneses
Gwendolyne García Leets
Angie Tadei
Claudio Rodríguez Medellín
Karla Gómez
Mery Roo
Román
Amanda Rosa
Alex Kaffie
Alejandra Bogue
Sergi Mass
Uriel del Toro
Melissa López
Odalys Ramírez
Silvia Olmedo
Karla Luna
Karla Panini
Juan Carlos Nava "El Borrego"
Juan Carlos Casasola
Leia Freitas
Platanito
Kalimba Marichal
Mario Cuevas "La Garra"
Beto y Lalo
  Natalia Tellez

Previous
Jorge Van Rankin
Facundo
Diego
Omar Chaparro
Esteban Arce
Sabrina Sabrok
Mónica Noguera
Yolanda Andrade
Montserrat Olivier
Kalinda Cano
Angie Fajardo
Horacio Villalobos
Lino Nava
Alfredo Fernández
Camila Sodi
Poncho Vera
Eduardo España (Margara Francisca)
Paola Rojas
Paula Sánchez
Eduardo Videgaray
Adriana Sodi
José Ramón San Cristóbal
Jonathan Molina
Federico Padilla "Perico"
Rafael Valderrama
Luz Blanchet
Martha Carrillo
Andrea Legarreta
Kristoff

Featured shows

Current
 Qué News Telehit
 Teleheat
 Jellyfish
 Top Topos
 Tu Talento Mis Contactos
 Retro Vibes
 Playhit
 Hot Songs
 Ok Pop
 Érase una vez
 D - Generaciones
 Tinderella
 Top 10 K-Pop
 Las Lavanderas
 La Escuelita Telehit
 Guerra de Chistes
 La isla del costeño
 Colección de oro
 Dementes Brillantes
 Adictos al Humor

Past
+Mas Nescafé
Calibre 45
El Calabozo
Telehit Live
Depásonico
Guaguarones S.A.
No Manches
Hi!
Válvula de Escape
Sabrina
Desde Gayola
Fresas con Chile
Toma Libre
Incógnito
Las hijas de la madre Tierra
Black & White
El Planeta de Cabeza
El Pulso
Encuentros Cercanos
El Show del Polaco
Kristoff Presenta

Logos

References

External links 
 Official site  
 Televisa Networks 

Television channels and stations established in 1993
Television networks in Mexico
Music television channels
Spanish-language television stations
Televisa pay television networks
Music organizations based in Mexico